La Torrecilla is a mountain with a height of , which lies southeast of Ronda in the Sierra de las Nieves Natural Park, of the Sierra de las Nieves range in the province of Málaga, Andalucia, Spain.

References

Mountains of Andalusia
Geography of the Province of Málaga
One-thousanders of Spain